Starhorse is a Sega horse racing arcade game which allows players to gamble for tokens.  The first in the Starhorse series appeared in 2000; it was followed by Starhorse 2001, Starhorse 2002, Starhorse Progress (2003), Starhorse2 New Generation (2005), and Starhorse Progress Returns (2009 sequel to Starhorse Progress.). Starhorse2 Second Fusion (2006) has the ability to simulate actual Japan Racing Association events. It was followed by StarHorse3 (2011).

In 2009, at least 10,657 machines of Starhorse2 Fifth Expansion (2009) alone had been sold to arcade operators, and by March 2011, the same game had grossed ¥4.8 billion from machine sales, equivalent to nearly $60 million. In 2011, StarHorse3 Season I: A New Legend Begins (2011) grossed ¥3.3 billion from arcade machine sales, equivalent to more than $40 million.

Footnotes

References

2000 video games
Arcade video games
Arcade-only video games
Horse racing video games
Sega arcade games
Sega Games franchises
Video games developed in Japan